Manyoni is a town in central Tanzania. It is the district headquarter of Manyoni District.

Transport
Paved trunk road T3 from Morogoro to the Rwanda border passes through the town.

The town of Manyoni has a station on the Central Railway of the Tanzanian Railways. The Singida line branches off from the main line in Manyoni town.

Population
According to the 2012 national census the population of Manyoni town - which is located in Manyoni ward - is 25,505.

References

Populated places in Singida Region